Klaipėda is a city in Lithuania on the Baltic Sea coast. The capital of the eponymous county, it is the third largest city and the only major seaport in Lithuania.

The city has a complex recorded history, partially due to the combined regional importance of the usually ice-free Port of Klaipėda at the mouth of the river . Located in the region of Lithuania Minor, at various times, it was a part of the Polish–Lithuanian Commonwealth, Prussia and Germany until the 1919 Treaty of Versailles. As a result of the 1923 Klaipėda Revolt it was annexed by Lithuania and has remained with Lithuania to this day, except between 1939 and 1945 when it was occupied by Germany following the 1939 German ultimatum to Lithuania.

The population has migrated from the city to its suburbs and hinterland. The number of inhabitants of Klaipėda city shrank from 202,929 in 1989 to 162,360 in 2011, but the urban zone of Klaipėda expanded well into the suburbs, which sprang up around the city and surrounded it from three sides. These are partly integrated with the city (city bus lines, city water supply, etc.) and the majority of inhabitants of these suburbs work in Klaipėda. According to data from the Department of Statistics, there are 212,302 permanent inhabitants (as of 2020) in Klaipėda city and Klaipėda district municipalities combined. Popular seaside resorts found close to Klaipėda are Neringa to the south on the Curonian Spit and Palanga to the north.

Names

The Teutonic Knights built a castle in the *Pilsāts Land of the Curonians and named it Memelburg; later the name was shortened to Memel. From 1252 to 1923 and from 1939 to 1945, the town and city were officially named Memel. Between 1923 and 1939, both names were in official use; since 1945 the Lithuanian name of Klaipėda has been used.

The names Memelburg and Memel are found in most written sources from the 13th century onwards, while Klaipėda is found in Lithuania-related sources since the 15th century. The first time the city was mentioned as Caloypede in the letter of Vytautas in 1413, for the second time in the negotiation documents of 1420 as Klawppeda, and for the third time in the Treaty of Melno of 1422 as Cleupeda. According to Samogitian folk etymology, the name Klaipėda refers to the boggy terrain of the town (klaidyti=obstruct and pėda=foot). Most likely the name is of Curonian origin and means "even ground": "klais/klait" (flat, open, free) and "peda" (sole of the foot, ground), as a reference to relatively flat terrain of the original settlement's surroundings.

The lower reaches of the river Neman were named either *Mēmele or *Mēmela by Scalovians and local Curonian inhabitants. In the Latvian Curonian language it means mute, silent (memelis, mimelis, mēms), as a reference to peaceful flow of the Neman. This name was adopted by speakers of German and also chosen for the new city founded further away at the lagoon.

Coat of arms

The coat of arms of Klaipėda is also used as coat of arms of Klaipėda city municipality. The modern version was created by the designer Kęstutis Mickevičius. The modern coat of arms was created by restoring old seals of the Memel city (analogous with those used in the years 1446, 1605 and 1618). It was affirmed on 1 July 1992.

History

Teutonic Knights
A settlement of Baltic tribes in the territory of the present-day city is said to have existed in the region as early as the 7th century.

In the 1240s the Pope offered King Håkon IV of Norway the opportunity to conquer the peninsula of Sambia. However, following the personal acceptance of Christianity by Grand Duke Mindaugas of Lithuania, the Teutonic Knights and a group of crusaders from Lübeck moved into Sambia, founding unopposed a fort in 1252 recorded as Memele castrum (or Memelburg, "Memel Castle"). The fort's construction was completed in 1253 and Memel was garrisoned with troops of the Teutonic Order, administered by Deutschmeister Eberhard von Seyne. Documents for its foundation were signed by Eberhard and Bishop Heinrich von Lützelburg of Courland on 29 July 1252 and 1 August 1252.

Master Conrad von Thierberg used the fortress as a base for further campaigns along the river Neman and against Samogitia. Memel was unsuccessfully besieged by Sambians in 1255, and the scattered Sambians submitted by 1259. Memel was colonized by settlers from Holstein, Lübeck and Dortmund, hence Memel also being known at the time as Neu-Dortmund, or "New Dortmund". It became the main town of the Diocese of Curonia, with a cathedral and at least two parochial churches, but the development of the castle became the dominant priority. According to different sources, Memel received Lübeck city rights in 1254 or 1258.

In the spring and summer of 1323, a Lithuanian army led by Gediminas came up the Neman and laid siege to the castle of Memel after conquering the town, and devastated Sambia, forcing the Order to sue for a truce in October. During the planning of a campaign against Samogitia, Memel's garrison of the Teutonic Order's Livonian branch was replaced with knights from the Prussian branch in 1328. Threats and attacks by Lithuanians greatly thwarted the town's development; the town and the castle were both sacked by Lithuanian tribes in 1379, while Samogitians attacked 800 workers rebuilding Memel in 1389.

The Treaty of Melno in 1422 stabilized the border between the Teutonic Order and the Grand Duchy of Lithuania for the next 501 years. In 1454, King Casimir IV Jagiellon incorporated the region to the Kingdom of Poland upon the request of the anti-Teutonic Prussian Confederation. After the subsequent Thirteen Years' War (1454–1466) the city became a part of Poland as a fief held by the Teutonic Knights, and thus located within the Polish–Lithuanian union. The rebuilt town received Kulm law city rights in 1475.

Duchy of Prussia 

Against the wishes of its governor and commander, Eric of Brunswick-Wolfenbüttel, Memel adopted Lutheranism after the conversion of Grand Master Albert of Prussia and the creation of the Duchy of Prussia as a fief of the Crown of the Kingdom of Poland in 1525, soon part of the Polish–Lithuanian Commonwealth. It was the onset of a long period of prosperity for the city and port. It served as a port for neighbouring Lithuania, benefiting from its location near the mouth of the Neman, with wheat as a profitable export. The Duchy of Prussia was inherited by a relative, John Sigismund, the Hohenzollern prince-electors of the Margraviate of Brandenburg in 1618. Brandenburg-Prussia began active participation in regional policy, which affected the development of Memel. From 1629 to 1635, the town was occupied by Sweden over several periods during the Polish-Swedish War of 1626–1629.

After the Treaty of Königsberg in 1656 during the Northern Wars, Elector Frederick William opened Memel's harbor to Sweden, with whom the harbor's revenue was divided. Sovereignty of the margraves of Brandenburg over the region was affirmed in the Treaty of Oliva in 1660.

The construction of a defence system around the entire town, initiated in 1627, noticeably changed its status and prospects. In November 1678 a small Swedish army invaded Prussian territory, but was unable to capture the fortress of Memel.

Kingdom of Prussia 

By the beginning of the 18th century, Memel was one of the strongest fortresses (Memelfestung) in Prussia, and the town became part of the Kingdom of Prussia in 1701. Despite its fortifications, it was captured by Russian troops during the Seven Years' War in 1757. Consequently, from 1757 to 1762 the town, along with the rest of eastern Prussia, was dependent on the Russian Empire. After this war ended, the maintenance of the fortress was neglected, but the town's growth continued.

Memel became part of the newly formed province of East Prussia within the Kingdom of Prussia in 1773. In the second half of the 18th century Memel's lax customs and Riga's high duties enticed English traders, who established the first industrial sawmills in the town. In 1784, 996 ships arrived in Memel, 500 of which were English. (In 1900 there was still an active English church in Memel, as well as a "British Hotel"). The specialisation in wood manufacturing guaranteed Memel's merchants income and stability for more than a hundred years. During this era it also normalised its trade relations with Königsberg; regional instability had degraded relations since the 16th century.

Memel prospered during the second half of the 18th century by exporting timber to Great Britain for use by the Royal Navy. In 1792, 756 British ships visited the town to transport lumber from the Lithuanian forests near Memel. In 1800 its imports consisted chiefly of salt, iron and herrings; the exports, which greatly exceeded the imports, were corn, hemp, flax, and, particularly, timber. The 1815 Encyclopædia Britannica stated that Memel was "provided with the finest harbour in the Baltic".

During the Napoleonic Wars, Memel became the temporary capital of the Kingdom of Prussia. Between 1807 and 1808, the town was the residence of King Frederick William III, his consort Louise, his court, and the government. On 9 October 1807 the king signed a document in Memel, later called the October Edict, which abolished serfdom in Prussia. It originated the reforms of Karl Freiherr vom und zum Stein and Karl August von Hardenberg. The land around Memel suffered major economic setbacks under Napoleon Bonaparte's Continental System. During Napoleon's retreat from Moscow after the failed invasion of Russia in 1812, General Yorck refused Marshal MacDonald's orders to fortify Memel at Prussia's expense.

During the January Uprising, in June 1863, Polish insurgents made an unsuccessful attempt of a naval landing near the city's harbor.

German Empire 

After the unification of Germany into the German Empire in 1871, Memel had the distinction of being Germany's northernmost city.

The development of the town in the 19th century was influenced by the industrial revolution in Prussia and the attendant processes of urbanisation. Even though the population of Memel increased fourfold during the 19th century, and had risen to 21,470 by 1910, its pace of development lagged in comparison. The reasons for this were mostly political. Memel was the northernmost and easternmost city in Germany, and although the government was engaged in a very costly tree-planting exercise to stabilise the sand-dunes on the Curonian Spit, most of the financial infusions in the province of East Prussia were concentrated in Königsberg, the capital of the province. Some notable instances of the German infrastructure investments in the area included sandbar blasting and a new ship canal between Pillau and Königsberg, which enabled vessels of up to 6.5 m draughts to moor alongside the city, at a cost of 13 million marks.

Owing to the absence of heavy industry in the 1870s and 1880s, the population of Memel stagnated, although wood manufacturing persisted as the main industry. It remained the central point of the Baltic timber-trade. A British Consul was located in the town in 1800; in 1900 a British Vice-Consul was recorded there, as well as a Lloyd's Agent.

By 1900 steamer services had been established between Memel and Cranz (on the southern end of the Curonian Spit), and also between Memel and Tilsit. A main-line railway was built from Insterburg, the main East Prussian railway junction, to St. Petersburg via Eydtkuhnen, the Prussian frontier station. The Memel line also ran from Insterburg via Tilsit, where a further direct line connected with Königsberg, that crossed the  Memel Valley over three bridges before its arrival in Memel.

During the second half of the 19th century, Memel was a center for the publication of books printed in the Lithuanian language using a Latin-script alphabet – these publications were prohibited in the nearby Russian Empire of which Lithuania was a province. The books were then smuggled over the Lithuanian border.

The German 1910 census lists the Memel Territory population as 149,766, of whom 67,345 declared Lithuanian to be their first language. The Germans greatly predominated in the town and port of Memel as well as in other nearby villages; the Lithuanian population was predominant in the area's rural districts.

Inter-war years and World War II 

Under the Treaty of Versailles after World War I, Klaipėda and the surrounding Klaipėda Region (Memel Territory) were detached from Germany and made a protectorate of the Entente States. The French became provisional administrators of the region until a more permanent solution could be worked out. Both Lithuania and Poland campaigned for their rights in the region. However, it seemed that the region would become a free city, similar to the Free City of Danzig. Not waiting for an unfavorable decision, the Lithuanians decided to stage the Klaipėda Revolt, take the region by force, and present the Entente with a fait accompli. The revolt was carried out in January 1923 while western Europe was distracted by the occupation of the Ruhr. The Germans tacitly supported the action, while the French offered only limited resistance. The League of Nations protested the revolt, but accepted the transfer in February 1923. The formal Klaipėda Convention was signed in Paris on 8 May 1924, securing extensive autonomy for the region.

The annexation of the city had enormous consequences for the Lithuanian economy and foreign relations. The region subsequently accounted for up to 30% of the Lithuania's entire production. Between 70% and 80% of foreign trade passed through Klaipėda. The region, which represented only about 5% of Lithuania's territory, contained a third of its industry. Weimar Germany, under Foreign Minister Gustav Stresemann, maintained normal relations with Lithuania. However, Nazi Germany desired to reacquire the region and tensions rose. Pro-German parties won clear supermajorities in all elections to the Klaipėda Parliament, which often clashed with the Lithuanian-appointed Klaipėda Directorate. Lithuanian efforts to "re-Lithuanize" Prussian Lithuanians by promoting Lithuanian language, culture, education were often met with resistance from the locals. In 1932, a conflict between the Parliament and the Directorate had to be resolved by the Permanent Court of International Justice. In 1934–1935, the Lithuanians attempted to combat increasing Nazi influence in the region by arresting and prosecuting over 120 Nazi activists for the alleged plot to organize an anti-Lithuanian rebellion. Despite rather harsh sentences, the defendants in the so-called Neumann–Sass case were soon released under pressure from Nazi Germany. The extensive autonomy guaranteed by the Klaipėda Convention prevented Lithuania from blocking the growing pro-German attitudes in the region.

As tensions in pre-war Europe continued to grow, it was expected that Germany would make a move against Lithuania to reacquire the region. German Foreign Minister Joachim von Ribbentrop delivered an ultimatum to the Lithuanian Foreign Minister on 20 March 1939, demanding the surrender of Klaipėda. Lithuania, unable to secure international support for its cause, submitted to the ultimatum and, in exchange for the right to use the new harbour facilities as a Free Port, ceded the disputed region to Germany in the late evening of 22 March 1939. Adolf Hitler visited the harbour and delivered a speech to the city residents. This was Hitler's last territorial acquisition before World War II. During the war, the Germans operated a forced labour subcamp of the Stalag I-A prisoner-of-war camp for Allied POWs in the city, and expelled Poles from German-occupied Poland were also enslaved as forced labour in the city's vicinity.

1945–present 

During World War II, from the end of 1944 into 1945, as Allied victory appeared imminent, the inhabitants fled as the fighting drew nearer. The nearly empty city was captured by the Soviet Red Army on 28 January 1945 with only about 50 remaining people. After the war the Klaipėda Region was incorporated into the Lithuanian SSR, as the post-1937 German occupation of various regions of Europe, including Klaipėda, was considered illegal.

The Soviets transformed Klaipėda, the foremost ice-free port in the Eastern Baltic, into the largest piscatorial-marine base in the European USSR. A gigantic shipyard, dockyards, and a fishing port were constructed. Subsequently, by the end of 1959, the population of the city had doubled its pre-war population, and by 1989 there were 203,000 inhabitants. In the aftermath of World War II almost all the new residents came to Klaipėda from Lithuania, Russia, Belarus and Ukraine, replacing the former German-speaking population.  Initially the Russian-speakers dominated local government in the city, but after the death of Joseph Stalin, more people came to the city from the rest of Lithuania than from other Soviet republics and oblasts; Lithuanians then became its major ethnic group. Among Lithuanian cities with a population greater than 100,000, however, Klaipėda has the highest percentage of people whose native language is Russian.

Until the 1970s, Klaipėda was only important to the USSR for its economy, while cultural and religious activity was minimal and restricted. The developers of a Roman Catholic church (Maria, Queen of Peace, constructed 1957–1962) were arrested. The city began to develop cultural activities in the 1970s and 1980s, such as the introduction of the Sea Festival cultural tradition, where thousands of people come to celebrate from all over the country. Based on the Pedagogical University of Šiauliai and the National Conservatory of Lithuania in Klaipėda, the University of Klaipėda was established in 1991. Klaipėda is now the home of a bilingual German-Lithuanian institution, the Hermann-Sudermann-Schule, as well as an English-language University, LCC International University.

In 2014 Klaipėda was visited 64 times by cruise ships, surpassing the Latvian capital, Riga, for the first time.

Demographics

, the population was 154,332. It is the first year since 2017 and the second year since 1991 when Klaipėda had a positive population growth in the city. The latest data shows that there are more women in the city: females make up 54.89% (84,717), males make up 45.11% (69,615).

City municipality
Klaipėda city municipality council is the governing body of the Klaipėda city municipality. It is responsible for municipal laws. The council is composed of 31 members (30 councillors and a mayor) directly elected for four-year terms.

The council is the member of the Association of Local Authorities in Lithuania.

Mayors
 1990–1992 – Povilas Vasiliauskas
 1992–1994 – Benediktas Petrauskas
 1994–1995 – Jurgis Aušra
 1995–1997 – Silverijus Šukys
 1997–2000 and 2000–2001 – Eugenijus Gentvilas
 2001–2003, 2003–2007, 2007–2011 – Rimantas Taraškevičius
 2011–2015, 2015–present – Vytautas Grubliauskas

Geography

Climate

Klaipėda's climate is humid continental (Köppen Dfb) with some oceanic (Köppen Cfb) climate influences. In July and August, the warmest season, high temperatures average , and low temperatures average . In January and February, the coldest season, high temperatures average  with low temperatures averaging .
The wettest month is November with a mean total precipitation . August through November is the wettest season because of the warmth of the Baltic sea in relation to the continent and the westerly winds. The driest month is February averaging  of total precipitation. Spring is not particularly wet.

Klaipėda is a windy city with many stormy days per year. In autumn and winter, gales are not unusual. Sea breezes are common from April to September. Snow can fall from October to April and a phenomenon resembling lake-effect snow is frequent. Severe snowstorms can paralyze the city in winter.

Klaipėda has unsettled weather all year round. Some winters can be cold and snowy, similar to that in Moscow, while others can be mild, windy, and rainy, similar to the weather in Glasgow. August 2005 was very rainy, while August 2002 barely had any precipitation at all.

Parks and forests 
Parks:

Forests:
 Klaipeda Forest
 Giruliai Forest
 Smiltyne Forest

Port of Klaipėda

The Port of Klaipėda is the principal ice-free port on the eastern coast of the Baltic Sea. It is the most important Lithuanian transportation hub, connecting sea, land and railway routes from East to West. Klaipėda is a multipurpose, universal, deep-water port. Nineteen big stevedoring companies, ship-repair and shipbuilding yards operate within the port and all marine business and cargo handling services are rendered.

The annual port cargo handling capacity is up to 40 Mt. The port operates 24 hours a day, seven days a week, all year round.

Infrastructure

Notable buildings 

The tallest building in Klaipėda is 34-storey Pilsotas.

Transportation

Railway

Klaipėda railway station (Lithuanian: Klaipėdos geležinkelio stotis) is located at Priestočio g. 1, north of the Old Town.

Klaipėda railway station consists of two buildings. The old building, made of yellow bricks and reflecting features of Classicism architecture was built in 1881. Currently, the building hosts various small businesses. The railway station is located in the new building, built of red bricks in 1983.

The railway network of then Prussia reached Klaipėda in 1878. Initially merely used for lumber and fish freight on Klaipėda–Šilutė, Klaipėda–Šilutė–Pagėgiai routes, the railway grid network of Lithuania Minor received a major boost after Klaipėda uprising and annexation of the region by Lithuania in 1923.

As of 2017 Lithuanian Railways were operating two routes from Klaipėda railway station. 4 daily trains on route Klaipėda – Vilnius and 2 daily trains on the Klaipėda–Radviliškis routes. Train tickets could be obtained at the station. lt or with a surcharge – on board the trains.

The railway station is served by the following buses of Klaipėda city passenger transport:
 No. 9 south of the city – city hospital (via Central Klaipėda Terminal)
 No. 6 south of the city – Melnragė district (Melnragė beaches)
 No. 8 south of city – bus station (through Old town)
 No. 15 south of the city – city hospital
 No. 100 bus station – Palanga International Airport (PLQ)

Airport

Domestic and international commercial scheduled airline services are provided by Palanga International Airport. The airport is connected with Klaipėda by a city bus.

Klaipėda is also serviced by a small, privately run aerodrome with a focus on sports aviation and charter services.

Ferries

Ferries to Smiltynė

Klaipėda is located next to Curonian Spit and a small part of the peninsula (Smiltynė) is within Klaipėda. People can reach the peninsula by ferry using one of the two terminals.
 The Old ferry terminal (Danės st. 1) – ferry from city center for passengers traveling on foot or with bikes;
 The New ferry terminal (Nemuno st. 8) – ferry for people with motorized vehicles.

International ferries
From Klaipėda there are three ferry lines and two ferry companies: DFDS Seaways and TT-Line.

DFDS operates ferries to Kiel (Germany) and Karlshamn (Sweden). Ferries depart from the Central Klaipėda Terminal (CKT). TT-Line ferries are going to Trelleborg (Sweden).

Buses

Klaipėda's bus public transportation is based on geographical peculiarities. It is arranged by the north-south axis, based on three parallel principal streets, running along the coast of Curonian Lagoon and thus making the grid logical and comfortable for commuting.

It is possible to buy an electronic card in shops and newspaper stands (kiosks) and top it up with an appropriate amount of money. Public transport is organized, supervised and coordinated by Klaipėda city passenger transport.

Buses to other cities and towns depart from Klaipėda bus station (Butkų Juzės g. 9).
Buses to Curonian Spit villages Nida and Juodkrantė depart from a bus stop in Smiltynė (next to the Old ferry terminal).

Trams
Trams in Klaipėda functioned in 1904—1934 and 1950—1967. It was one only tram transport in the last years of first independent Lithuania and in Soviet Lithuania and one only electric tram ever in country. It was interurban transport serving not Klaipėda only. It was operated by Memeler Kleinbahn AG company.

Tram system had two lines with 12 km of tracks and 17 tramcars. First line was from old city (lighthouse and Strandvilla restaurant) through center and northern suburbs Royal (Didžioji) Vitė and Bomelio Vitė localities to sea beaches and resort Melnragė. Second line was from old city through industrial suburb Royal Smeltė to south to Wilhelm channel and Wooden bay. Lines had connection near Stock exchange in center of city. Branch connected the center with railway station through Liepaja (now Manto) Street and Liepaja (now Lietuvninku) Square. Other branch passed near Winter port through Vite locality. In 1950—1967 tram run functioned in line to Smeltė only. Tram lines used for delivery of goods from railway and port also. Tram degradated and closed due to wear and tear and lack of funds for its renewal and development.

Now city's authorities plans to revive tram and includes them in urban plan-general. Line will be interurban again and plans to connect Klaipėda with Šventoji through airport and Palanga. In 2017 feasibility study began for first tram line on Herkus Manto and Taikos streets

Old town

Klaipėda's Old Town is notable among other towns in Lithuania for its abundance of German and Scandinavian architecture. Klaipėda's Old Town is unique with its fachwerk architectural style and the planned street structure, which is uncharacteristic to any other old town in Lithuania. Its streets are geometrically configured very correctly, and the angle of intersection is always straight.

One of the most popular places in Klaipėda's old town is The Theatre Square. It hosts a variety of concerts, the Sea Festival, the International Jazz Festival and other events. An important focus of the Theatre Square is the Taravos Anikė sculpture depicting a youthful barefoot girl. The sculpture was erected in the memory of the poet Simonas Dachas and perpetuates one of the poet's described heroes.

Culture and contemporary life

Historical
Klaipėda's main attractions are the historic buildings in the city's centre, dating from the 13th to 18th centuries. Some of its older buildings have picturesque half-timbered construction, similar to that found in Germany, France, England, Denmark and southern Sweden. Other places of interest include:
 The remnants of the Klaipėda Castle, built in the 13th century by the Teutonic Order. It had a massive bulk and a quadrangular tower, surrounded by the ramparts and brick bastions. It lost importance after the Russian occupation from 1756 to 1762, and thenceforth started to decay.
 The Žardė ancient settlement, situated on the right bank of the river Smiltelė. It is dated to the late Iron Age (10th century), and was inhabited until the 16th century.
 The remnants of the so-called "Dutch" defence system around the entire town from the 17th–18th centuries.
 The maritime museum in Fort Wilhelm, built at the end of the 19th century at the spike of the Curonian Spit.

Cinemas
 Arlekinas
 Forum cinemas

Theatres

 Klaipėda Musical theatre
 Klaipėda Drama theatre
 Klaipėda Puppet theatre
 Apeironas theater
 Dance theater "Šokio teatras"
 Klaipėda youth theater "Klaipėdos jaunimo teatras"

Museums

 "39–45"
 "Amber Queen" museum of amber
 Blacksmiths museum
 Castle museum
 Clocks museum
 Exposition of resistance movement and deportation
 Lithuanian Art Museum Pranas Domšaitis gallery
 The History Museum of Lithuania Minor
 Maritime museum and Dolphinarium

Maritime Museum 

The museum with 6 different exhibitions is set in a former nineteenth-century fortification of the Spit. In the Maritime Museum, there is a huge aquarium, the exhibitions of marine fauna, mammals and seabirds. The aquarium is populated with invertebrates, and freshwater fish of Lithuania – many species, not only from the Baltic Sea, but also from various tropical seas. The museum's courtyard has a pool filled with seals, sea lions, and penguins. The marine fauna exhibition has diverse exhibits: mollusk shells, various fossils, algae and other special exhibits, surviving the prehistorical dinosaur times.

Festivals
Annual events include Klaipėda Music Spring, the Klaipėda Castle Jazz Festival, Museum Nights, the International Festival of Street Theatres, the International Short Film Festival, and the Klaipėda Sea Festival, among others. The Parbėg laivelis folk festival is held every two years.

Cityscape

Urbanism and architecture

The city plan is linear, stretching along the shores of the Curonian Lagoon and the Baltic Sea. Main parts of the city are: Old Town on the left bank of the Danė River (a rectangular network of streets was formed in the 13th-15th centuries there), Naujamiestis on the right bank of the Danė River (the central part is divided into elongated quarters), new residential areas built after 1945 (Pempininkai, Naujakiemis, Alksnynė, Gedminai, and others). The specifics of the port city are emphasized by the quays, warehouses, half-timbered and industrial buildings typical of the Klaipėda Region.

Some of the fortification structures and facilities have survived (built before the 20th century): Klaipėda Castle (13th–18th centuries) and bastion (built from 1559) remains (on the left bank of Danė River; since 2002 it is part of the Klaipėda Castle Museum), bastion complex (on the right bank of Danė River; dating to the 15th–18th centuries). Old public buildings have survived in the old town (Theater Palace, built on the site of a burnt-down classicist building in 1857; following its rebuilding in 1893 it acquired the features of neoclassicism, now Klaipėda Drama Theater), half-timbered and brick warehouses (Aukštoji Street 3, 3a, 3b, now Klaipeda Art Exhibition Palace, Daržų Street 10; all from the 18–19th centuries), residential houses (Baroque, 1774, now The History Museum of Lithuania Minor, half-timbered in Sukilėlių Street 19, end of the 18th century; Aukštoji Street 5–13, 18th–19th centuries).

Following the fire of 1854, the city was intensively rebuilt. In Naujamiestis district, which began to form in the second half of the 19th century, historicist style buildings were built of which the most notable are: the so-called arcade-style State Bank (1858), Courthouse (1862), the railway station (1875), the Louise Gymnasium (1891), the neo-Gothic Post Office (1890, architect H. Schoede), the barracks complex (1907, now Klaipeda University Central Palace), Teachers' Seminary (1908), City Hospital (1902), Craftsmen's Shelter (1910). Many residential houses were built during this period (neo-baroque residence in Liepų Street 7, neoclassical palace in Liepų Street 12, expanded around 1820, late 19th century, now Klaipėda Clock and Watch Museum, wooden villa in Giruliai, Šlaito Street 4, second half of the 19th century, merchant H. Gerlach Neo-Renaissance villa, 1874, now Klaipėda County I. Simonaitytė Public Library), industrial buildings (Gas Factory, 1861, architect J. Hartmann, later expanded, fachwerk Union Chemical Fertilizer Factory, 1869–80, pulp factory, 1900, later expanded, from 1994 Klaipėda Cardboard Company), bridges (bascule bridge over the canal between the castle and Danė River, 1855). The bascule bridge was important economically for the city as every passing vessel was required to pay a bridge lifting fee.

In the early 20th century, the Jugendstil style buildings were built in the city (houses at Tiltų Street 13, H. Manto Street 30, villa at Smiltynės Street 11). Following the Restoration of Independence of Lithuania and Klaipėda Revolt, the Red Cross Hospital (1933, architect R. Steikūnas; now Klaipėda County Hospital), Vytautas Magnus Gymnasium (1934, architect H. Reissmann), Klaipėda Pedagogical Institute Sports Hall (1937, architect V. Landsbergis ‑ Žemkalnis; since 2005 Klaipėda Physical Culture and Recreation Center), City Savings Bank (1938), Power Plant Complex (3rd-4th decade of the 20th century, architect of some buildings H. Reissmann) were built and are characterized by rationalist features.

During the World War II, 60% of the buildings were destroyed. Moreover, the buildings reminiscent of Klaipėda's Germans were destroyed, and the remains of bombed-out Catholic and evangelical Reformed churches were demolished. During the Soviet occupation, the historical part of Klaipėda was redesigned. The construction of the St. Church of the Queen Mary of Peace was started in 1957 with the funding of the believers (architect J. Baltrėnas), however in 1960 it was deprived of believers and a branch of the LSSR Philharmonic was established there in 1963 (it was returned to the believers in 1988), Palace of Culture (1963, architect A. Mikėnas, now Klaipėda Musical Theater), Marriage Palace (1980, architect R. V. Kraniauskas), Lithuanian Maritime Museum and Aquarium (1979, architects P. Lapė, L. Šliogerienė; located in Kopgalis Fortress, 1866), Hotel Klaipėda (1986, architect G. Tiškus; now Amberton Klaipėda). Following the Re-Establishment of the State of Lithuania, the Dolphinarium of the Lithuanian Maritime Museum (1994, architect P. Lapė), large shopping centers, administrative buildings, hotels and residential buildings were built.

Sports

Economy

Nowadays, Klaipėda is an industry, business, education and science, health, tourism and recreation, administrative center. Historically, Klaipėda is one of the most successful developing municipalities in western Lithuania. City generates approximately 12 percent of the country GDP and about 80 percent of western Lithuania. It is greatly influenced due to the Port of Klaipėda which is a very important transport hub. In the eastern part of the city there is Klaipėda Free Economic Zone offering 0 percent tax incentives for first 6 years. It is also the location of the first Geothermal Demonstration Plant in the Baltic States, which is supplying the city with geothermal heating and Fortum Klaipėda Combined Heat and Power Plant. In 2014, Klaipėda LNG FSRU with FSRU Independence ship was opened and guaranteed the alternative way of supplying the country with gas.

Most of the city's GDP is generated in the service sector. Inhabitants of Klaipėda have a higher income than the average of Lithuania. In the city there are such companies as Švyturys brewery, DFDS Lisco, Klaipėdos jūrų krovinių kompanija, Baltija Shipbuilding Yard, Vakaru Shipbuilding Yard, security company Argus, the largest cardboard and paper packaging processor in the Baltic States Grigeo Klaipėda, Balticum TV.

According to the Lithuanian Department of Statistics, GDP in the second quarter of 2017, comparing with the first quarter of 2017, has increased by 7.7 percent, while comparing with the second quarter of 2016 it has increased by 4.0 percent. The rise is also planned in the further years.

Media

Radio 
 Radijas 9 91.4 FM
 Laluna 94.9 FM
 Kelyje 99.8 FM
 Raduga 100.8 FM
 European Hit Radio 96.2 FM
 Power Hit Radio 96.7 FM
 Zip FM 92.5 FM

Television
 Balticum TV

Newspapers
 Vakarų ekspresas
 Klaipeda

Education

Since the 14th century Klaipėda became one of the most important education centers of the Lithuania minor. Klaipėda has 2 universities, 5 colleges. As well as schools of general education: elementary schools, middle schools, gymnasiums, pro gymnasiums.

Gymnasiums
Klaipėda Varpas gymnasium

High schools

Universities 
 Klaipėda University
 LCC International University
 Lithuanian Academy of Music and Theatre

Colleges 
 Klaipėda State University of Applied Sciences
 Lithuanian Maritime Academy
 West Lithuania Business College
 University of Applied Social Sciences
 Klaipėda Business Higher School

Libraries 
 Klaipėda County Ieva Simonaitytė Public Library
 Klaipėda City Municipality Public Library

Notable residents

 Simon Dach (1605–1659), poet and writer of the Ännchen von Tharau song
 Matthäus Prätorius (1635–1704), Protestant pastor, historian, ethnographer
 David Wilkins, (1685–1745) a Prussian orientalist, settled in England
 Michael Wohlfahrt (1687–1741), religious leader in Pennsylvania
 Andreas Murray (1695–1771), Swedish priest
 Johan Daniel Berlin (1714–1787), Norwegian rococo composer and organist
 Friedrich Wilhelm Argelander (1799–1875), astronomer
 Yisrael Salanter (1810–1883), founder of Musar movement within Judaism
 Julius Kröhl (1820–1867), German-American submarine pioneer
 James Hobrecht (1825–1902), German director for urban planning of Berlin
 Isaac Rülf (1831–1902), editor-in-chief of Memeler Dampfboot, philosopher, activist
 Heinrich Drews (1841–1916) orchestrated the National Anthem of El Salvador
 David Wolffsohn (1856–1914), second president of World Zionist Organization
 Clara Schlaffhorst (1863–1945), voice educator
 George Adomeit (1879–1967), painter
 Charlotte Susa (1898–1976), actress
 Werner Wolff (SS officer) (1922–1945)
 Arno Esch (1928–1951) liberal politician in (SBZ) (Soviet Occupied Zone)
 Gerhard Spiegler (1929–2015) former President of Elizabethtown College Pennsylvania
 Tomas Venclova (born 1937), poet and author
 Werner Ulrich (born 1940), is a former East German sprint canoer
 Lena Valaitis (born 1943), pop singer
 Hans Henning Atrott (born 1944), philosopher and pro-euthanasia activist
 Leonidas Donskis (1962–2016), philosopher and critic
 Gitanas Nausėda, (born 1964), President of Lithuania
 Mindaugas Piecaitis (born 1969), conductor/composer of Catcerto for Nora the Piano Cat
 Eurelijus Žukauskas (born 1973), European basketball champion
 Rolandas Muraška (born 1973), former tennis player
 Saulius Štombergas (born 1973), European basketball champion
 Violeta "Sati" Jurkonienė (born 1976), Lithuanian singer
 Tomas Danilevičius (born 1978), Lithuanian football (soccer) player
 Živilė Rezgytė, (born 1978), rhythmic gymnast and business executive
 Arvydas Macijauskas (born 1980), European basketball champion
 Tomas Delininkaitis (born 1982), basketball player
 Tomas Vaitkus (born 1982), cycling champion
 Valdas Vasylius (born 1983), basketball player
 Gintaras Januševičius, (born 1985), pianist
 Monika Liu, (born 1988), singer-songwriter who represented Lithuania in the Eurovision Song Contest 2022

Twin towns – sister cities

Klaipėda is twinned with:

 Cleveland, United States
 Gdynia, Poland
 Karlskrona, Sweden
 Kotka, Finland
 Kuji, Japan
 Liepāja, Latvia
 Lübeck, Germany
 Mannheim, Germany
 North Tyneside, England, United Kingdom
 Odesa, Ukraine
 Sassnitz, Germany
 Szczecin, Poland

The city was previously twinned with:
 Cherepovets, Russia
 Kaliningrad, Russia
 Mogilev, Belarus

Cooperation agreements
Klaipėda has an additional cooperation agreement with:
 Porto, Portugal

See also
 Neighborhoods of Klaipėda
 Ports of the Baltic Sea

References
 Baedeker, Karl. Northern Germany. London, 1904, p. 178.
 Christiansen, Eric. The Northern Crusades. Penguin Books. London, 1997. pp. 107, 160, 248. 
 The Columbia Electronic Encyclopedia (2006).
 Gathorne-Hardy, Geoffrey Malcolm. A Short History of International Affairs, 1920 to 1934. Oxford University Press, 3rd impression, May 1936, p. 89/91.
 Encyclopædia Britannica 1938 Year Book.
 Hagen, Ludwig: Die Seehäfen in den Provinzen Pommern und Preußen. Berlin 1885 (2 Bände, Band 2: Memel)
 Kirby, David. The Baltic World, 1772–1993: Europe's Northern Periphery in an Age of Change. Longman. London, 1999. p. 42, 133. 
 Kirby, David. Northern Europe in the Early Modern Period: The Baltic World, 1492–1772. Longman. London, 1990. p. 366 
 Koch, Hannsjoachim Wolfgang. A History of Prussia. Barnes & Noble Books. New York, 1993. pp. 35, 54, 194. 
 Urban, William. The Teutonic Knights: A Military History. Greenhill Books. London, 2003, pp. 65, 121. 
 Woodward, E.L., Butler, Rohan, (editors). Documents on British Foreign Policy 1919–1939 (1939), Third Series, volume IV. HMSO, London, 1951.

Notes

External links

 Municipal website, klaipeda.lt
 Klaipėda Tourism and Culture Information Center website, klaipedainfo.lt
 Klaipėda In Your Pocket City Guide (also a downloadable PDF guide), inyourpocket.com
 
 Klaipėda State Seaport, portofklaipeda.lt
 University of Klaipėda, ku.lt
 LCC International University, lcc.lt
 Klaipėda on Google Maps, maps.google.com
 Klaipėda for tourists, tripadvisor.com
 wiki-de.genealogy.net, Port of Memel

 
Cities in Lithuania
Lithuania Minor
Capitals of Lithuanian counties
Cities in Klaipėda County
Port cities and towns of the Baltic Sea
Municipalities of Klaipėda County
Municipalities administrative centres of Lithuania
Kulm law
Members of the Hanseatic League